Jean-François Grimaldi (born 14 July 1988) is a French professional footballer who plays for Gallia Club Lucciana in the Championnat National 3.

Club career
Born in Bastia, Grimaldi started his career with his hometown club SC Bastia, at the time a Ligue 2 club. In 2009, he was called up by Bernard Casoni and made his debut in a 2–0 loss to Dijon FCO. He left the club at the end of the season, joining fourth-division club Sporting Toulon Var.

Only a year after, he returned to Bastia, this time with CA Bastia. In three years, Grimaldi helped his new club gain promotion from the fourth tier to the second level of French football.

When CA Bastia merged with Borgo FC in 2017, Grimaldi remained at the newly formed club, FC Bastia-Borgo.

International career
Grimaldi, born in Corsica, is eligible to the unofficial Corsica national team and played his first game in 2009, against Congo in a 1-1 draw in Ajaccio.

References

External links
 
 

1988 births
Living people
Association football midfielders
French footballers
Ligue 2 players
Championnat National players
Championnat National 2 players
Championnat National 3 players
SC Bastia players
SC Toulon players
CA Bastia players
FC Bastia-Borgo players
Corsica international footballers
Footballers from Corsica